The Dangerous Drugs Board (DDB) is a government agency tasked in creating policies in dealing with illegal drugs in the Philippines.

Background
At the time the Republic Act 6425, also known as the Dangerous Drugs Act of 1972, was approved on March 30, 1972, there are 20 thousand drug users and marijuana is the most preferred illegal drug among users in the country. The board was established  on November 14, 1972 under the Office of the President after the proclamation of Martial Law in the country by then President Ferdinand Marcos.

The DDB was mandated to be the policy-making and coordinating agency as well as the national clearing house on all matters pertaining to law enforcement and control of dangerous drugs; treatment and rehabilitation of drug dependents; drug abuse prevention, training and information; research and statistics on the drug problem and the training of personnel engaged in these activities.

Composition
Seven national agencies in the country initially formed part of the Dangerous Drugs Board. These are the Department of Health, Department of Social Service and Development (now Department of Social Welfare and Development), Department of Education, Culture and Sports (now Department of Education), Department of Justice, Department of National Defense, Department of Finance and the National Bureau of Investigation.

The membership of the board was expanded through the Republic Act 9165. Through the law the Department of the Interior and Local Government, Department of Labor and Employment, Department of Foreign Affairs, Commission on Higher Education, National Youth Commission, and the Philippine Drug Enforcement Agency which was recently established at the time became members of the DDB.

Chairmen

References

Government agencies under the Office of the President of the Philippines
1971 establishments in the Philippines
Drug policy organizations
Drug policy of the Philippines